Mojo Tour 2010 is a live album released by Tom Petty & The Heartbreakers. It was released exclusively through Tom Petty's official website on December 14, 2010 as a free download to anyone who purchased a ticket for his 2010 summer tour. Previously, Mojo was also given away as a free digital download to the same summer tour ticket customers.

An expanded edition of Mojo Tour 2010 was also released on the same date for members of the Highway Companions Club who joined the club between February 23, 2010 and February 24, 2011. The expanded edition is 73-minutes long and includes six additional live tracks from the summer tour.

The download was made available in three different formats. 320K MP3 (high quality), Apple Lossless (higher quality), and FLAC (highest quality).

Track listing

Personnel
Tom Petty – lead vocals, 6 and 12 string acoustic and electric guitars, percussion
Mike Campbell – lead guitar, slide guitar, 12-string guitar, mandolin, electric sitar
Benmont Tench – acoustic and electric pianos, Hammond and combo organs, synthesizer, backing vocals
Scott Thurston – rhythm guitar, synthesizer, harmonica, backing vocals
Ron Blair – bass guitar, backing vocals
Steve Ferrone – drums, percussion

References

External links
TomPetty.com - Tom Petty & The Heartbreakers official website

Tom Petty live albums
2010 live albums
Warner Records live albums